These Are The Days is the second studio album by Danish rock band Saybia, released on September 13, 2004.

Track listing

Musicians
 Søren Huss – vocals, acoustic guitar
 Jeppe Langebek Knudsen – bass
 Palle Sørensen – drums
 Sebastian Sandstrøm – guitar
 Jess Jenson – keyboards

External links
International fansite
Official website

2004 albums
Saybia albums